Andrew Steven Werner (born February 25, 1987) is an American college baseball coach former professional baseball pitcher. He is the pitching coach at Bradley University. He played college baseball at Illinois Central College in 2006 and 2007 before transferring to the University of Indianapolis in 2008 and 2009. He played in Major League Baseball (MLB) with the San Diego Padres in 2012.

High School and College
Werner graduated from Washington Community High School in 2005. He attended Illinois Central College in 2006 and 2007. He pitched for the University of Indianapolis in 2008 and 2009. On May 16, 2009, in his final game for the University of Indianapolis, Werner struck out 11 University of Southern Indiana batters in relief.

Professional career

Independent Leagues
Werner was never drafted. In 2009, Werner pitched for the Evansville Otters of the independent Frontier League. In 2010, Werner worked as the pitching coach for Eureka College, and then pitched for the Otters and the Windy City ThunderBolts, also of the Frontier League.

San Diego Padres
Werner was signed by the San Diego Padres as an undrafted free agent after the 2010 season. In 2011, Werner pitched for the Fort Wayne TinCaps and the Lake Elsinore Storm. In 2012, he pitched for the San Antonio Missions and the Tucson Padres before being called up to the majors for the first time on August 22, 2012.

Oakland Athletics
On November 16, 2012, Werner was traded to the Oakland Athletics with Andy Parrino for Tyson Ross and A.J. Kirby-Jones.

On December 4, 2013, Werner was designated for assignment by Oakland, to clear room on the 40-man roster for recently signed pitcher Scott Kazmir. Werner cleared waivers and was outrighted to Triple-A Sacramento.

Ottawa Champions
Werner signed to play with the Ottawa Champions in the Canadian American Association of Professional Baseball in 2015. He became a free agent after the 2015 season.

Coaching career
Werner began his coaching career as the head assistant coach at Illinois Central College. In 2017, Werner was the pitching coach at University of South Carolina Aiken. The following year he was named the pitching coach at Young Harris College. On August 16, 2019, Werner was named the pitching coach at Bradley University.

Personal life
Werner married his wife, Melanie, in February 2012.

References

External links

Indianapolis Greyhounds bio

1987 births
Living people
San Diego Padres players
Indianapolis Greyhounds baseball players
Evansville Otters players
Windy City ThunderBolts players
Fort Wayne TinCaps players
Lake Elsinore Storm players
San Antonio Missions players
Tucson Padres players
Sacramento River Cats players
Midland RockHounds players
Ottawa Champions players
Illinois Central Cougars baseball players
Illinois Central Cougars baseball coaches
USC Aiken Pacers baseball coaches
Young Harris Mountain Lions baseball coaches
Bradley Braves baseball coaches
Sportspeople from Peoria, Illinois
Baseball players from Illinois